Gigantophis is an extinct genus represented by its sole member Gigantophis garstini, a giant snake. Before the Paleocene constrictor genus Titanoboa was described from Colombia in 2009, Gigantophis garstini was regarded as the largest snake ever recorded. It lived about 40 million years ago during the Eocene epoch of the Paleogene Period, in the Paratethys Sea, within the northern Sahara, where Egypt and Algeria are now located.

Description

Size 

If , it would have been more than 10% longer than its largest living relatives.

Discovery 
The species is known only from a small number of fossils, mostly vertebrae.

Its discovery was published in 1901 by paleontologist Charles William Andrews, who described it, estimated its length to be about 30 feet, and named it garstini in honor of Sir William Garstin, KCMG, the Under Secretary of State for Public Works in Egypt.
In 2013, vertebrae collected in Pakistan were found to be similar to Gigantophis vertebrae collected in Egypt, but their exact affinities are uncertain.

Classification 
Gigantophis garstini is classified as a member of the extinct family Madtsoiidae.

References

Eocene snakes
Eocene reptiles of Africa
Fossil taxa described in 1901
Taxa named by Charles William Andrews